Arsenius, was an Eastern Orthodox prelate and theologian.

He is first mentioned in 1351, at Constantinople. At the time he was already Metropolitan of Tyre and Sidon, and controlled the Hodegon Monastery in the Byzantine capital. A fervent anti-Palamite, he wrote an appeal for his position to Emperor John VI Kantakouzenos and participated in the 1351 synod at Constantinople on Palamas' Hesychast doctrine. After the Palamite victory, he left the city, but before leaving, he consecrated the historian and fellow anti-Palamite Nikephoros Gregoras as a monk. Despite the publication of three minor anti-Palamite polemics in 1360, he had returned to Constantinople by 1361, before leaving for a stay in Cyprus (1361/62). From 1366 to 1376 he was a rival Patriarch of Antioch against the incumbent Pachomius, seeking to expand his jurisdiction against the Patriarchate of Constantinople.

References

Sources 
 

14th-century Byzantine people
Byzantine theologians
14th-century Eastern Orthodox bishops
Hesychasts
Tyre, Lebanon
14th-century Byzantine writers
14th-century Eastern Orthodox theologians